Erreway presenta su caja recopilatoria is compilation of hits of  Argentine band Erreway. It was released in 2007, specially for Spain, but it was sold in other parts of the world. On compilation, there are songs from their albums Señales and Tiempo and live performed songs. There are also two DVDs, one with Erreway's videos, and one with videos from their tour.

About compilation
Three members of Erreway - Camila Bordonaba, Felipe Colombo and Benjamin Rojas - used old materials from albums and DVDs to make compilation for their public in Spain. Erreway used songs from their albums Señales and Tiempo (but not from Memoria) and videos for singles from these two album. On album, there is one CD with live performed songs and one with videos from live concerts in Spain. Even she is not member of Erreway anymore, Luisana Lopilato was on CD cover.

Songs

Albums

DVDs

Erreway albums
2007 compilation albums
2007 live albums
2007 video albums
Live video albums